Miconia huigrensis is a species of plant in the family Melastomataceae. It is endemic to Ecuador.  Its natural habitat is subtropical or tropical dry shrubland.

References

Endemic flora of Ecuador
huigrensis
Vulnerable plants
Taxonomy articles created by Polbot